The 2013 Acropolis Rally was the sixth round of the 2013 World Rally Championship season. The event was based in Loutraki, Corinthia, and started on 31 May and was concluded on 2 June after fourteen special stages, totaling 306 competitive kilometres.

Report 

Jari-Matti Latvala took his first win of the 2013 season, and his first win for Volkswagen on the Acropolis Rally. The opening forty-seven kilometre stage proved to be difficult, claiming three high-profile victims in Sébastien Ogier, Mads Østberg and Mikko Hirvonen in short order, and Evgeny Novikov emerged as the surprise early leader, building up a thirty-second advantage at the end of the first leg. The Russian's lead was short-lived, as he developed a puncture early in the second leg and was forced to limp back to the service park. Latvala took control of the rally while Andreas Mikkelsen in the third factory-supported Polo R began to work his way up through the points-paying positions. He ultimately missed out on a podium finish of his own, as Dani Sordo and Thierry Neuville each took their second podium finish of the season with second and third place respectively. Latvala's result was briefly challenged by Citroën, who believed his car was in violation of the technical regulations, but the protest was dismissed and Latvala's result was confirmed, allowing him to secure second place in the drivers' championship standings behind team-mate Ogier.

Entry list 

Eleven World Rally Cars were entered into the event, as were sixteen WRC-2 entries and tend for the JWRC.

Results

Event standings

References 

Acropolis
Acropolis Rally
Rally Acropolis